Martin John McManus (born 16 November 1961) is a former Australian politician. Born in Hobart, Tasmania, he trained first in electrical and industrial electronics. Later completing tertiary studies in teaching. He is the great-grandson of Edward Mulcahy, a long-serving Tasmanian Senator and MHA. On 19 October 2001, he was elected as a Liberal Member to the Tasmanian House of Assembly for the seat of Franklin in a recount caused by the resignation of Peter Hodgman. He was defeated for re-election in 2002—when both the leader and deputy leader of the Liberal Party also lost their seats. Martin McManus served as an alderman for the Clarence City Council, first elected in October 1996 and also as Deputy Mayor. He remained an elected member for the City of Clarence for 17 years, concluding in October 2014. Martin McManus is a graduate of both the University of Tasmania and the University of New South Wales. He was teaching Maths and Science at St Aloysius Catholic College in Huntingfield, Tasmania, where was also the pastoral leader for Grade 7 until December 2021. He is now a relief teacher at St Aloysius Catholic College.

References

1961 births
Living people
Liberal Party of Australia members of the Parliament of Tasmania
Members of the Tasmanian House of Assembly
21st-century Australian politicians